Kelseys Original Roadhouse is a Canadian restaurant chain headquartered in Vaughan, Ontario owned by Recipe Unlimited. Recipe Unlimited also owns other restaurants including Swiss Chalet, Milestones, Montana's and Harvey's. Founded in 1978, there are Kelseys restaurants across Canada, excluding the province of Quebec (where the chain was withdrawn in 2008).

History
Once a chain of more than 140 locations from Quebec westerly to British Columbia, the company has closed all but two locations in British Columbia, shuttered nine locations in Alberta, closed all locations in Saskatchewan, and closed all locations in Manitoba. In Ontario, numerous locations across the company have closed including locations in Kitchener, Simcoe, and Fort Erie. The Owen Sound location was due to close on December 20, 2013. As of November 2013 there are just 88 Kelseys locations left in Canada, primarily in the province of Ontario.

Kelseys has a licensing agreement through early 2011 with CBS Consumer Products for the rights to the theme song from the 1980s sitcom Cheers, which the chain says could lead to "other opportunities" in the future. Kelseys also uses the show's title in its slogan "Cheers to good friends", although (due to the generic nature of the word "cheers" in regards to pubs and the like) it is not clear whether permission from CBS was required for this.

Rebranding
Kelseys' parent company Recipe Unlimited has been going through an era of rebranding and renovations including its location at 1011 The Queensway Etobicoke, Ontario where the company is piloting a new restaurant design that features an emphasis on a newer style of Kelseys dining experience. Many under-performing Kelseys restaurants have been closing down over the past couple of years and the new design is going to try to change the customer's eating experience to become more lively and exciting. The restaurant's old slogan "Neighbourhood Bar and Grill" has been upgraded to "Ambitiously Hardworking and Sociably Unpredictable". Bright neon colours are found throughout the restaurant along with an upgraded menu that features a smaller and more limited selection of the most popular items found at other Kelseys locations. The new bar menu that was first used at this Kelseys is now available throughout all 88 locations in Ontario, Manitoba and British Columbia. The new bar menu is modelled after its location in Etobicoke featuring bright neon colours along with new items that reflect more of a pub than a bar and grill. The restaurant design is going to be applied to more locations when the franchisees choose to upgrade.

Criticism
A CBC Marketplace investigation in February 2018 found the Kelseys servers in Ontario had to tip out 3% of their sales, a rise from 2% prior to the province's minimum wage increase.

See also
List of Canadian restaurant chains 
List of assets owned by Recipe Unlimited

References

External links

Article on Kelseys withdrawal from the Quebec market

Recipe Unlimited
Companies based in Mississauga
Restaurant chains in Canada